Nimbapanchax is a genus of African rivulines, fish endemic to freshwaters in tropical West Africa.

Species
There are currently five recognized species in this genus:
 Nimbapanchax jeanpoli (Berkenkamp & Etzel, 1979) (Jeanpol's killi)
 Nimbapanchax leucopterygius Sonnenberg & Busch, 2009
 Nimbapanchax melanopterygius Sonnenberg & Busch, 2009
 Nimbapanchax petersi (Sauvage, 1882)
 Nimbapanchax viridis (Ladiges & Roloff, 1973)

References

Nothobranchiidae
Freshwater fish genera